When I Dream is the fifth studio album by American country music singer Crystal Gayle. It was released on June 2, 1978 at the height of her career. It was her second consecutive #2 country album on the Billboard charts. Two singles from the album reached #1 on the Country Singles chart: "Talking in Your Sleep" (also a Top 20 Pop hit) and "Why Have You Left the One You Left Me For". The title song, "When I Dream", is a longer re-recorded version of a song that appeared originally on her 1975 debut album Crystal Gayle, and reached #3. A fourth single, "Heart Mender", peaked at #58. "Hello I Love You" was featured in the 1982 movie, Six Pack, starring Kenny Rogers, Erin Gray and Diane Lane.

The album achieved a gold disc the year it was released but was certified platinum by the RIAA in 1982. It was also Gayle's second album to chart in the UK, where it reached #25, and was awarded a silver disc by the BPI.

Track listing

Personnel
Crystal Gayle - vocals
Biff Watson, Billy Sanford, David Kirby, Johnny Christopher, Ray Edenton, Reggie Young, Rod Smarr, Sonny Curtis - guitar
Bob Moore, Joe Allen, Mike Leech, Richard "Spady" Brannan, Tommy Cogbill - bass
Lloyd Green - steel guitar, resonator guitar
Chris Leuzinger - slide guitar
Bobby Emmons, Bobby Wood, Charles Cochran, Dwight Scott, Hargus "Pig" Robbins, Richard Durrett - keyboards 
Cindy Reynolds - harp
Gene Chrisman, Jimmy Isbell, Kenny Malone, Vic Mastrianni - drums, percussion

Production
Produced by Allen Reynolds
Recorded by Garth Fundis
Engineered by John Donegan
Mastering: Glenn Meadows

Charts

Weekly charts

Year-end charts

References

Crystal Gayle albums
1978 albums
Albums produced by Allen Reynolds
United Artists Records albums